In cryptography, the socialist millionaire problem is one in which two millionaires want to determine if their wealth is equal without disclosing any information about their riches to each other. It is a variant of the Millionaire's Problem whereby two millionaires wish to compare their riches to determine who has the most wealth without disclosing any information about their riches to each other.

It is often used as a cryptographic protocol that allows two parties to verify the identity of the remote party through the use of a shared secret, avoiding a man-in-the-middle attack without the inconvenience of manually comparing public key fingerprints through an outside channel. In effect, a relatively weak password/passphrase in natural language can be used.

Motivation 
Alice and Bob wish to learn if  without allowing either party to learn anything else about the other's secret value.

Even if one of the parties is dishonest and deviates from the protocol, that person cannot learn anything more than if .

An active attacker capable of arbitrarily interfering with Alice and Bob's communication (a man-in-the-middle) cannot learn more than a passive attacker and cannot affect the outcome of the protocol other than to make it fail.

Therefore, the protocol can be used to authenticate whether two parties have the same secret information. Popular instant message cryptography package Off-the-Record Messaging uses the Socialist Millionaire protocol for authentication, in which the secrets  and  contain information about both parties' long-term authentication public keys as well as information entered by the users themselves.

Off-the-Record Messaging protocol 

The protocol is based on group theory.

A group of prime order  and a generator  are agreed upon a priori, and in practice are generally fixed in a given implementation.

By , denote the secure multiparty computation, Diffie–Hellman–Merkle key exchange, which, for the integers, returns  to each party:
 Alice calculates  and sends it to Bob, who then calculates .
 Bob calculates  and sends it to Alice, who then calculates .
Note that this procedure is insecure against man-in-the-middle attacks.

The socialist millionaire protocol only has a few steps that are not part of the above procedure, and the security of each relies on the difficulty of the discrete logarithm problem, just as the above does.  All sent values also include zero-knowledge proofs that they were generated according to protocol.

Part of the security also relies on random secrets.

Note that:

and therefore
.

This proves correctness.

See also
 Zero-knowledge proof

References

External links
 Description of the OTR-Messaging Protocol version 2
 The Socialist Millionaire Problem - Explain it like I'm Five
 Goldbug Messenger, which uses an implementation the Socialist Millionaire Protocol

Theory of cryptography